The District of Viseu is located in the Central Inland of Portugal, the District Capital is the city of Viseu.

Municipalities
The district is composed by 24 municipalities:

 Armamar
 Carregal do Sal
 Castro Daire
 Cinfães
 Lamego
 Mangualde
 Moimenta da Beira
 Mortágua
 Nelas
 Oliveira de Frades
 Penalva do Castelo
 Penedono
 Resende
 Santa Comba Dão
 São João da Pesqueira
 São Pedro do Sul
 Sátão
 Sernancelhe
 Tabuaço
 Tarouca
 Tondela
 Vila Nova de Paiva
 Viseu
 Vouzela

List of Parliamentary Representatives

Summary of votes and seats won 1976-2022

|- class="unsortable"
!rowspan=2|Parties!!%!!S!!%!!S!!%!!S!!%!!S!!%!!S!!%!!S!!%!!S!!%!!S!!%!!S!!%!!S!!%!!S!!%!!S!!%!!S!!%!!S!!%!!S!!%!!S
|- class="unsortable" align="center"
!colspan=2 | 1976
!colspan=2 | 1979
!colspan=2 | 1980
!colspan=2 | 1983
!colspan=2 | 1985
!colspan=2 | 1987
!colspan=2 | 1991
!colspan=2 | 1995
!colspan=2 | 1999
!colspan=2 | 2002
!colspan=2 | 2005
!colspan=2 | 2009
!colspan=2 | 2011
!colspan=2 | 2015
!colspan=2 | 2019
!colspan=2 | 2022
|-
| align="left"| PS || 23.0 || 3 || 21.4 || 2 || 20.9 || 2 || 30.9 || 4 || 20.0 || 2 || 17.9 || 2 || 19.4 || 2 || 38.4 || 4 || 38.1 || 4 || 31.1 || 3 || style="background:#FF66FF;"|40.4 || style="background:#FF66FF;"|4 || 34.7 || 4 || 26.7 || 3 || 29.7 || 3 || 35.4 || 4 || style="background:#FF66FF;"|41.5 || style="background:#FF66FF;"|4
|-
| align="left"| PSD || style="background:#FF9900;"|32.2 || style="background:#FF9900;"|4 || align=center colspan=4 rowspan=2|In AD || style="background:#FF9900;"|36.6 || style="background:#FF9900;"|4 || style="background:#FF9900;"|37.7 || style="background:#FF9900;"|5 || style="background:#FF9900;"|64.1 || style="background:#FF9900;"|8 || style="background:#FF9900;"|64.3 || style="background:#FF9900;"|7 || style="background:#FF9900;"|44.3 || style="background:#FF9900;"|4 || style="background:#FF9900;"|44.3 || style="background:#FF9900;"|4 || style="background:#FF9900;"|52.1 || style="background:#FF9900;"|5 || 40.2 || 4 || style="background:#FF9900;"|37.5 || style="background:#FF9900;"|4 || style="background:#FF9900;"|48.4 || style="background:#FF9900;"|5 || align=center colspan=2 rowspan=2|In PàF || style="background:#FF9900;"|36.2 || style="background:#FF9900;"|4 || 36.8 || 4
|-
| align="left"| CDS-PP || 31.2 || 4 || 20.7 || 2 || 19.9 || 2 || 7.0 ||  || 6.3 ||  || 11.5 || 1 || 10.5 || 1 || 10.6 || 1 || 8.6 || 1 || 13.4 || 1 || 12.4 || 1 || 5.9 ||  || 2.1 || 
|-
| align="left"| AD || colspan=2| || style="background:#00FFFF;"|64.1 || style="background:#00FFFF;"|8 || style="background:#00FFFF;"|66.8 || style="background:#00FFFF;"|8 || colspan=26|
|-
| align="left"| PRD || colspan=8| || 10.9 || 1 || 1.7 || 0 || colspan=20|
|-
| align="left"| PàF || colspan=26| || style="background:#00AAAA;"|51.1 || style="background:#00AAAA;"|6 || colspan=4|
|-
! Total seats || colspan=2|11 || colspan=10|10  || colspan=16|9 || colspan=4|8
|-
! colspan=33|Source: Comissão Nacional de Eleições
|}

See also
 Villages in the district of Viseu
 Roda
 Pardieiros
 Urgeiriça

References 

 
Districts of Portugal